Mark Aiken is a Northern Irish actor.

Biography
Aiken was born in Belfast, Northern Ireland and attended The London Academy of Music and Dramatic Art. He has appeared in numerous UK and US TV drama series including CSI: Crime Scene Investigation, The Sarah Jane Adventures, Spooks, Waking the Dead, Jonathan Creek and Soldier Soldier. He also appeared in the second series of the famous Gold Blend couple advertisements for Nescafé.

Selected filmography

 The Return of Shelley (1990, TV Series) - Constable Myers
 Birds of a Feather (1991, TV Series) - Tom
 A Small Dance (1991) - Rob
 The Nicholas Craig Masterclass (1992, TV Series) - Bill
 Charles and Diana: Unhappily Ever After (1992) – Nick
 Casualty (1993, TV Series) - Michael Volare
 Chiller (1995, TV Series) - Declan O'Hare
 Game On (1995, TV Series) - Male Assistant
 Nelson's Column (1995, TV Series) - Tony
 Thief Takers (1996, TV Series) - Francis Conti
 Clancy's Kitchen (1997) - Clancy Self
 Dressing for Breakfast (1998, TV Series) - Mike
 Unfinished Business (1998, TV Series) - Kiril
 The Hello Girls (1998, TV Series) - Dave Curtis
 Jonathan Creek (1999, TV Series) - Robin Priest
 Dubrovnik Twilight (1999) - Tom
 Beast (2000, TV Series) - John
 The Blind Date (2000) - Michael Smythe
 Black Books (2000, TV Series) - Ben
 Judge John Deed (2001, TV Series) - Roberto Romero
 Mersey Beat (2002, TV Series) - Guy Morgan
 Waking the Dead (2002, TV Series) - Tim Walker
 Charmed (2003, TV Series) - Dark Knight
 No Angels (2004, TV Series) - Paul Merchant
 Wonderfalls (2004, TV Series) - Dr. Frank Chambers
 Alias (2005, TV Series) - Fintan Keene
 Headhunter (2005) - Doug Bennet
 CSI: NY (2005, TV Series) - Whitman Price
 Las Vegas (2006, TV Series) - Paul Logan
 CSI: Miami (2006, TV Series) - Colin Danville
 24 (2009, TV Series) - Nichols
 Trinity (2009, TV Series) - Mr. Pearce
 Spooks (2009, TV Series) - Russell Price
 Lewis (2011, TV Series) - Donald Voss
 The Sarah Jane Adventures (2011, TV Series) - Joseph Serf
 The Case (2012, TV Mini-Series) - Paul Carrington
 CSI: Crime Scene Investigation (2012, TV Series) - Arthur Martens
 100 Streets (2016) - Keith Negotiator
 Astral (2018) - Dr. James Lefler
 Father Brown (2019, TV Series) - Major Basil Winthrop - S7E3 “The Whistle in the Dark”

References

Male television actors from Northern Ireland
Living people
Male actors from Belfast
Year of birth missing (living people)
20th-century male actors from Northern Ireland
21st-century male actors from Northern Ireland